NGC 195 is a spiral galaxy located in the constellation Cetus. It was discovered in 1876 by Wilhelm Tempel.

References

External links
 

0195
-02-02-079
Barred spiral galaxies
Cetus (constellation)
002391